Benefield is a civil parish in North Northamptonshire, England, along the A427 road and about  east of Corby and  west of Oundle.

History
The villages name means 'open land of Bera's people'.

The name has evolved from Benefield (11th century); Banefield, Benifeld (12th); Beningfelde, Benefilde, Berifelde, Benetfeld, Benifeud, Beningfeud (13th); Benyngfielde alias Benefielde alias Beddingfielde (16th). The Domesday Book refers to it as Benefield.

Demographics
According to the 2001 Census it had a population of 308, 146 males and 162 females in 138 households. increasing to 339 at the 2011 census.

Governance
The parish consists of Upper Benefield and Lower Benefield. The village has its own Parish Council. The local unitary council is North Northamptonshire Council.

Facilities
Lower Benefield has a village hall which was refurbished in 2009.

Upper Benefield used to have a pub 'The Wheatsheaf' pub and hotel, originally a coaching inn dating from the 17th century. The pub is now closed and being renovated to residential properties. There is also a cricket club.

Benefield Parish Church in Lower Benefield is dedicated to St Mary and is part of the Benefice of Benefield, Glapthorn and Oundle St Peter's. It is in the Rural Deanery of Oundle and is part of the Archdeaconry of Oakham within the Diocese of Peterborough. Only the chancel of the old church was retained, dating from the 14th-century.

Notable residents
 Miles Joseph Berkeley (1803-1889)  cryptogamist, clergyman, and founder of the study of plant pathology

Other buildings

Biggin Hall
The Hall dates from ca.1700 and is partly hidden behind a portico of ca.1750. There are two pavilions at each end. Miles Joseph Berkeley (1 April 1803 – 30 July 1889), an English cryptogamist and clergyman, and one of the founders of the science of plant pathology, was born in the Hall.

Benefield Castle
Established in 1208, all that remains is a moated platform west of the church. It has been derelict since 1315 or earlier. It may have been one of the numerous forts thrown up during the anarchy of King Stephen's reign (1138–44). It was in existence in 1208, when John seized it for the debts of Hugh de Lisurs. On 15 May 1264, the day following the Battle of Lewes, Henry III, while a prisoner with Simon de Montfort, issued a mandate to the knights and others in Benefield Castle, stating that peace having been made between the king and his barons, they were not to go out of the castle nor do any ill in those parts. It was probably in the following year that, the castle being held for Edward the king's son, the men of the castle plundered the manor of Biggin and crossed the river to Oundle, where and at Ashton they took a number of cattle. The men of Oundle, however, made a counter-attack and recovered many of their beasts. Not long after this date the castle was probably dismantled. In 1298 it is described as an old castle, (fn. 4) and in 1315 the site of the castle only is referred to. (fn. 5) It continued a ruin and is so described in 1378.

Rectory Farm
The building dates from 1877-8 and is tall and gabled.

Fermyn Woods Hall
The south side of the stables has the gateway from nearby Lyveden New Bield as its centrepiece. The Hall was occupied by the Belville family in the 1930s. When they left its size was reduced and parts auctioned off including the elaborate large porch.

References

External links 

Wildlife around Benefield and Oundle
The Benefice of Benefield, Glapthorn and Oundle St Peter's

Villages in Northamptonshire
North Northamptonshire
Civil parishes in Northamptonshire